Gerry McCulloch is a Scottish television presenter, sports reporter and football commentator.

Broadcasting career 

McCulloch is a former BBC Scotland, Setanta and STV journalist and television presenter.

While at STV, McCulloch presented The Live Hogmanay Show, and was a roving reporter for the Scottish kids magazine show Skoosh and the lifestyle magazine programme The Five Thirty Show. He was best known, however, for working as a sports news presenter on the Central Scotland edition of STV News at Six and, from March 2010, presenting the sports magazine show Sports Centre: Friday Night Football alongside Sheelagh McLaren.  He also fronted STV's live coverage of Scotland v Brazil from the Emirates Stadium in February 2011, as well as hosting coverage of the Murrayfield Rugby Sevens.

McCulloch left STV in August 2011 after it was announced that STV would be dropping Friday Night Football from their schedule, and shortly afterwards started appearing as an on-screen football reporter on Sky Sport's flagship Saturday football show Soccer Saturday.

Previously, he worked for Setanta Sports as a commentator and voice-over artist for its SPL and European football coverage. he is a professional fud

Other media work 
He is also a media trainer and presenter coach. He was also a presenter on Bid TV (formerly known as Bid-Up TV), between 2000–2003, and L!VE TV's local Edinburgh station at launch in 1997.

Until 2017, McCulloch was a host for superscoreboard on Radio Clyde but left to be a correspondent on Celtic TV.

Personal life 

McCulloch is a classically trained concert pianist.

References

External links 
 Gerry McCulloch at stv.tv

Living people
Scottish television presenters
STV News newsreaders and journalists
Year of birth missing (living people)